The Belli were an ancient pre-Roman Celtic Celtiberian people that lived in the modern Spanish province of Zaragoza.

Belli may also refer to:

 Belli (surname)
 Belli, Bismil
 Belli (Metal), a synonym for silver in Kannada-language from South India
 Belli (film), a 2014 Kannada-language Indian drama film
 Belli dentro, an Italian comedy television series
 Belli Moda, a 1967 Kannada movie by Puttanna Kanagal
 Belli Modagalu, a 1992 Indian Kannada language drama film, directed by K. V. Raju
 Belli Park, Queensland, suburb on the Sunshine Coast, Queensland, Australia
 Casus belli, a Latin expression meaning "An act or event that provokes or is used to justify war"

See also
 Beli (disambiguation)
 Belly (disambiguation)